Meaghan Rickard (born January 15, 1997) is an American ice hockey forward, currently playing for the Boston Pride in the National Women's Hockey League (NWHL).

Career 
Rickard scored 80 points in 146 NCAA games with the Providence Friars over 4 years.

Rickard signed a one-year deal with the Boston Pride of the NWHL on December 17, 2020, rejoining her former Friars teammate Christina Putigna.

Personal life 
Rickard has a degree in Elementary/Special Education from Providence College.

Career stats

Source

Honours 
2016–2017 Named Providence Friars most improved player
2018–2019 Three Time Hockey East Top Performer 
Source

References

External links
 
 
 

1997 births
Living people
American women's ice hockey forwards
Boston Pride players
Providence Friars women's ice hockey players
Ice hockey players from Rhode Island
Isobel Cup champions
Premier Hockey Federation players
People from Coventry, Rhode Island